CINEP / Peace Program – Centro de Investigación y Educación Popular / Programa por la Paz (CINEP/PPP) – is a non-profit foundation created by the Society of Jesus in Colombia. The Center for Research and Popular Education was founded in 1972 for promoting equitable and sustainable human development. In 1987 the Program for Peace was added to work toward a just and lasting peace in the country.

History 
The Center for Research and Popular Education (CINEP) was founded by the Society of Jesus in 1972 with the task of promoting integral and sustainable human development. In 1987, the Program for Peace (PPP) was added to contribute to the construction of just and lasting peace in Colombia. In 1988 CINEP/PPP along with the Conference of Religious of Colombia created the Human Rights and Political Violence Bank to preserve the memory of the victims of the civil war and to denounce serious violations of human rights. The work of CINEP/PPP now includes research, education, advocacy, and communication, along with support to social organisations.

References  

Jesuit development centres
Organizations established in 1972
Charities based in Colombia
Research institutes in South America
Women's rights in South America
Community-building organizations
Peace organizations